Asanosho Hajime (born 23 December 1969 as Hajime Ozawa, later Hajime Ozuka) is a former sumo wrestler from Odawara, Kanagawa, Japan. He made his professional debut in March 1992, and reached the top division in March 1995. His highest rank was maegashira 2. He defeated yokozuna Akebono in their first meeting in March 1997 to earn his only kinboshi. A back injury sent him down to the sandanme division, and he decided to retire in January 2002, after suffering a detached retina. He became an elder of the Japan Sumo Association, but left in January 2008.

Career
Ozawa played volleyball at junior high school and was also a shotputter. He began sumo in high school,  and competed for the sumo club at Kinki University. Upon graduation he was accepted by the Wakamatsu stable run by fellow Kinki University alumni, the former ōzeki Asashio. He made his professional debut in March 1992, and was given makushita tsukedashi status because of his collegiate sumo experience, allowing him to begin at the bottom of the third highest makushita division. He reached sekitori level upon promotion to the second highest jūryō division in May 1994. To mark the occasion he changed his shikona or fighting name from his family name to Asanosho, the "Asa" prefix meaning morning a common one at his stable. He was promoted to the top makuuchi division in March 1995.

Asanosho never managed to win a special prize in his top division career, and was unable to reach the san'yaku ranks, peaking at maegashira 2 in March 1997. In this tournament he had his first and only win over a yokozuna, defeating Akebono in the pair's first ever meeting. However he fell just short of a majority of wins with a 7–8 record. He returned to maegashira 2 in September 1999 but again scored 7–8. He fought in 32 makuuchi tournaments, with a record of 213 wins against 248 losses, with 19 injury absences. He was demoted from makuuchi after the May 2000 tournament and was forced to withdraw from the following tournament in July with a herniated disc after fighting just one match, which saw him fall to makushita.

Retirement from sumo
After suffering a recurrence of his herniated disc injury which sent him down to the sandanme division, Asanosho was beginning to make a comeback and climb the makushita division when he suffered a detached retina, missing the November 2001 tournament. He decided to retire and his last tournament on the banzuke was in January 2002. He did not own stock in the Japan Sumo Association but was able to stay temporarily under the jun-toshiyori system, using his fighting shikona as his elder name. In September 2003 he switched to the Wakamatsu name, changing to Sanoyama when Wakamatsu was needed by his retiring former stablemate Asanowaka in April 2005. In August 2005 he switched to Sekinoto when the former Fukunohana turned 65 and retired, and in February 2007 he changed to Oshiogawa. In August 2007 that name was needed by the former Wakatoba so he changed to Wakafuji. However, in January 2008 the owner of the Wakafuji name, Ōtsukasa lent it to his former stablemate Yōtsukasa and Asanosho was forced to leave sumo, as no other elder names were available. He later worked in general sales at a logistics company in Osaka, and he has been a coach in local amateur sumo. In March 2018 he was appointed as a hyōgiin or outside voter in the Sumo Association, although he has no oyakata status.

Fighting style
Asanosho was well known for his attacking tsuppari style, using a series of rapid thrusts to the opponent's chest to force them out of the dohyō. When fighting on the mawashi or belt his favoured grip was hidari-yotsu, a left hand outside, right hand inside position. His most common winning kimarite were oshi-dashi (push out), tsuki-dashi (thrust out) and hataki-komi (slap down).

Career record

See also
Glossary of sumo terms
List of past sumo wrestlers

References

External links

1969 births
Living people
Japanese sumo wrestlers
Sumo people from Kanagawa Prefecture